Hemipsalodon ("half-scissor tooth") is an extinct genus of hyainailourid hyaenodonts from paraphyletic subfamily Hyainailourinae that lived in North America during the middle to late Eocene.

Description 
The most complete skull (O.M.S.I. No. 619), belonged to an old individual. It is powerfully-built, and overall superficially resembles the mesonychid Harpagolestes. The nasal opening is quite large. The canines are greatly enlarged. The anterior portion of the skull is broad anteriorly, but narrows down considerably posteriorly.

Phylogeny 
The phylogenetic relationships of genus Hemipsalodon are shown in the following cladogram.

See also 
 Mammal classification
 Hyainailourinae

References 

Eocene mammals of North America
Hyaenodonts
Prehistoric mammal genera
Clarno Formation